Nigüelas is a municipality located in the province of Granada, Spain. According to the 2012 census (INE), the town has a population of 1203.

In September, there is the celebration of its famous a party around the village with different customs. Then the virgin of sorrows performed a procession. After you can enjoy the good music in the main square.

References

Municipalities in the Province of Granada